Samskara, saṃskāra, saṅskāra or sanskara may refer to:

 Sanskara (rite of passage), Hindu and Jain rites of passage
 Samskara (ayurvedic), a technique in ayurvedic medicine
 Samskara (Indian philosophy), the concept of imprints or impressions left on the mind by experience in Indian philosophies
 Saṅkhāra, the Buddhist concept of "formations"
 Samskara (film), an Indian film based on the novel by U. R. Ananthamurthy

See also
 Samsara (disambiguation)